In enzymology, an imidazole N-acetyltransferase is an enzyme that catalyzes the chemical reaction

acetyl-CoA + imidazole  CoA + N-acetylimidazole

Thus, the two substrates of this enzyme are acetyl-CoA and imidazole, whereas its two products are CoA and N-acetylimidazole.

This enzyme belongs to the family of transferases, specifically those acyltransferases transferring groups other than aminoacyl groups.  The systematic name of this enzyme class is acetyl-CoA:imidazole N-acetyltransferase. Other names in common use include imidazole acetylase, and imidazole acetyltransferase.

References 

 

EC 2.3.1
Enzymes of unknown structure